Squadron Leader Monath Erash Perera was a fighter pilot who served in the No. 10 Squadron of the Sri Lanka Air Force.

Born on 13 October 1982 in Galle, he completed his education at Mahinda College in Galle. Perera joined the Sri Lanka Air Force on 1 August 2004 and was commissioned as a pilot officer in July 2005. He played a major role during the final phase of the Sri Lankan Civil War, having joined the jet squadron to fly the Kfirs in 2007. Perera, who was promoted to the rank of flight lieutenant in 2010, had completed 450 air time hours and participated in 75 operations during his period of service.

He was killed on 1 March 2011 when two Kfir jets belonging to No. 10 Jet Squadron of SLAF Base Katunayake, which were en route to fly the final rehearsal of the 60th Anniversary of the Sri Lankan Air Force, crashed near Yakkala in the Gampaha District. He was posthumously promoted to the rank of squadron leader for his contribution to several Sri Lankan military operations during the civil war.

References

External links
Heroes - Sri Lanka Air Force

1982 births
2011 deaths
Sri Lankan Air Force officers
Sri Lankan aviators
Alumni of Mahinda College
Sri Lanka Air Force Academy graduates
People from Galle
Sinhalese military personnel